Finn Ludt (16 November 1918 – 3 August 1992) was a Norwegian pianist, composer and music critic. He was born in Fana. He made his concert debut in Bergen in 1945. He composed several songs, including "Blåklokkevikua", "Blåbærturen" and "Lillebrors vise" with text by Alf Prøysen, "Vårherres klinkekule" and "Hildringstimen" by Erik Bye, "Berre" by Arnljot Eggen and "Vandringsvise" by Einar Skjæraasen. He composed ballets and stage music, working for Det Norske Teatret and Radioteatret. He was a music critic for Morgenbladet from 1946.

References

1918 births
1992 deaths
Musicians from Bergen
Norwegian composers
Norwegian male composers
Norwegian music critics
20th-century Norwegian writers
20th-century pianists
20th-century composers
Norwegian male pianists
20th-century Norwegian male musicians